Annie Flood (born May 16, 2003) is an American Paralympic volleyballist. At the age of 18, Flood won a gold medal at the 2020 Summer Paralympics.

Early life
Flood was born on May 16, 2003, in Salem, Oregon to parents Jeff and Linda. Flood was born with fibular hemimelia and learned to walk on a prosthetic leg. When she was 10 years old, Flood received her first grant for an athletic leg which she used to play soccer and run.

Career
Flood was introduced to sitting volleyball through a summer camp in Ohio in 2016. Shortly thereafter, she started training in the National Team A2 program and about a year later started training with the US national team. During her senior year at South Salem High School, Flood was a member of the gold medal-winning sitting volleyball team at the 2020 Summer Paralympics. Following the Games, she returned to North America to attend Linfield University for a degree in intensive care nursing.

References

External links
 
 

2003 births
Living people
American sitting volleyball players
Women's sitting volleyball players
Paralympic volleyball players of the United States
Paralympic gold medalists for the United States
Paralympic medalists in volleyball
Volleyball players at the 2020 Summer Paralympics
Medalists at the 2020 Summer Paralympics
Sportspeople from Salem, Oregon
21st-century American women